Epibellowia is a genus of Asian dwarf spiders that was first described by A. V. Tanasevitch in 1996.  it contains only three species: E. enormita, E. pacifica, and E. septentrionalis.

See also
 List of Linyphiidae species (A–H)

References

Araneomorphae genera
Linyphiidae
Spiders of Asia
Spiders of Russia